Andraegoidus translucidus is a species of beetle in the family Cerambycidae. It was described by Botero & Monne in 2011.

References

Trachyderini
Beetles described in 2011